Chronographia (Greek: Χρονογραφία), meaning "description of time", and its English equivalents, Chronograph and Chronography, may refer to:

 Chronographiae of Sextus Julius Africanus, covering events from Creation to 221
 Chronographia, part of the Chronicon of Eusebius of 325
 Chronograph of 354, covering events from Creation to 353
 Chronographia Scaligeriana, work of 
 Chronographia of John Malalas, covering 
 Chronographia of Theophanes the Confessor, covering events from 284 to 813
 Chronographikon syntomon of Nikephoros I of Constantinople (died 828)
 Chronographia tripartita of Anastasius Bibliothecarius, written in 807–874
 Bulgarian Chronograph, anonymous (10th century)
 Chronographia of Michael Psellos, covering events from 976 to the 1070s
 Chronica sive Chronographia of Sigebert of Gembloux (died 1112)
 Chronographia of Johannes de Beke, written in 1346
 Chronographia interminata of Conrad of Halberstadt the Younger, written in 1355
 Chronographia regum Francorum, written in 1405–1429

Sources

See also
Demetrius the Chronographer